A Misfit Earl is a 1919 American silent comedy film directed by Ira M. Lowry, and starring Louis Bennison, Samuel Ross, Charles Brandt, Neil Moran, Ida Waterman, and Claire Adams. The film was released by Goldwyn Pictures on November 16, 1919.

Plot

Cast
Louis Bennison as Jim Dunn
Samuel Ross as Sam
Charles Brandt as Earl of Dunhaven
Neil Moran as John Grahame
Ida Waterman as Lady Caroline Croxter
Claire Adams as Phyllis Burton
Herbert Standing as Hon. Guy Wyndham
Barbara Allen as Alysse Byecroft

Preservation
A print of the film survives at the Museum of Modern Art.

References

External links

1919 comedy films
Silent American comedy films
1919 films
American silent feature films
American black-and-white films
Goldwyn Pictures films
1910s American films